Warren Olney (1841–1921) was an American lawyer who served as 34th mayor of Oakland, California.

Warren Olney may also refer to:

Warren Olney Jr. (1870–1939), justice of the Supreme Court of California
Warren Olney III (1904–1978), United States Assistant Attorney General, Criminal Division, from 1953–1957
Warren Olney IV, American broadcast journalist